Susanne Aartun Sundfør ( (local Haugesund dialect; [sʉˈsɑ̀nːə ˈɔ̀ʈːʉːn ˈsʉ̀nføːr] in Urban East ("standard") Norwegian); born 19 March 1986) is a Norwegian singer-songwriter and record producer. Born and raised in Haugesund, Sundfør embarked on her musical career two years prior to the release of her self-titled debut studio album (2007), which reached number three on the Norwegian album chart. It was followed by Take One, a live album consisting of songs from her debut. 

Her second studio album, The Brothel, was released in 2010 to commercial success in Norway, peaking at number one and becoming the best-selling album of that year. The album saw a shift from the piano-driven pop of previous releases towards a more ambitious and electronic direction. Its title track reached number two on the Norwegian singles charts, the highest of her career. In 2011, she released a live instrumental album composed solely of synthesizers, A Night at Salle Pleyel, serving as a commission piece.

Her third studio album, The Silicone Veil (2012) topped the Norwegian album chart and received critical acclaim. She had her international breakthrough in 2015 with her fourth studio album, Ten Love Songs, which saw Sundfør experimenting with an electronic dance pop sound. The album reached number one and garnered universal acclaim. Her fifth studio album Music for People in Trouble (2017) represented a departure from the electronic-driven sound of previous records in favor of a return to her roots as a folk singer-songwriter. The album reached number one in Norway as well, making it her fourth consecutive album to achieve this feat.

Early life
Sundfør was born in Haugesund on 19 March 1986. She is the granddaughter of theologian and linguist Kjell Aartun. After attending a music high school, she began making music as a hobby. She stated she started playing music when she was six, saying: "I would go to these classes where we would just sing and play the tambourine. You know, it wasn't really serious, but I really liked it so I started playing the violin when I was eight, then taking piano lessons when I was nine, and then singing lessons when I was twelve. So I was playing music at an early stage, but I didn't really take it that seriously. I wasn't practicing that much or anything. Then I went to a music high school, and I guess that's what you'd call my education in music." Sundfør also studied English and art at the University of Bergen.

Career

2005–2007: Career beginnings and Susanne Sundfør

Sundfør rose to fame in her homeland in 2005, when she toured Norway opening for English singer Tom McRae. In 2006, she joined Norwegian band Madrugada on tour, performing their song "Lift Me", a duet the band originally recorded in the studio with singer Ane Brun. In November, she released her debut single "Walls", which would climb to number three on the Norwegian singles chart. Her self-titled debut studio album was released in March 2007 and peaked at number three on the Norwegian album chart.

2008–2009: Take One
Susanne Sundfør was followed by the 2008 live album Take One, consisting of acoustic versions of songs from her debut album. Sundfør considers it to be "kind of like a remix album. Like if you have an album of just remixes of an earlier record you made, that's how I see it. So I don't really see it as an album like the other ones." That same year, Sundfør covered Bob Dylan's "Masters of War" at Store Studio, NRK. The following month, she was awarded Spellemannprisen for best female performance. She spurred nationwide debate when she accepted the award, stating her work represented her as an artist first, and a woman second, bringing into question whether the Norwegian Grammy board was acting archaically with such gender-specific awards. That same month, Sundfør appeared on Mette-Marit, Crown Princess of Norway's album Sorgen og Gleden , with the Norwegian folk-tune psalm "Ingen Vinner Frem til Den Evige Ro"  by Lars Linderot and Gustav Jensen. Later in 2008, Sundfør moved to Oslo.

2010–2011: The Brothel
In 2010, her second studio album The Brothel was released to critical acclaim in Norway and ended up becoming the best-selling album of the year. The album saw a shift from the piano driven pop from previous releases towards a more ambitious and electronic sound. Sundfør described it as a "conceptual album with both quite acoustic and electronic soundscapes." Dagbladet wrote that Sundfør was so good that other young Norwegian artists would start crying when hearing her—both because she is several leagues above them, but also because her music is so moving and beautiful. It was at this time that Sundfør decided to commit to music as a profession. She said in a 2013 interview, "I think I only decided that this is something that I wanted to spend my entire life doing after I released The Brothel, because that was the first time I really felt like I had 'found' a sound." Later that year, Sundfør briefly joined the band Hypertext, and they released their second album Astronaut Kraut!. She also appeared that year on folk/rock band Real Ones' single "Sister to All".

In 2011, she provided vocals on the title track from Nils Petter Molvær's album Baboon Moon. She also released an instrumental album, A Night at Salle Pleyel. The album is a live recording of a specially commissioned piece for the Oslo Jazz Festival's 25th anniversary. Sundfør composed it solely of synthesizers with a team of four keyboardists chosen by her: Ådne Meisfjord, Morten Qvenild, Øystein Moen and Christian Wallumrød. Sundfør considers the album to be more of a side project from her main project.

2012–2013: The Silicone Veil

In 2012, Sundfør released the critically acclaimed "White Foxes", which served as the lead single to her third studio album The Silicone Veil, which is also Sundfør's first album to be released in the UK. The album received highly positive reviews from music critics internationally, and was a commercial success in Norway, debuting at number one on the album chart. Later that year, her collaboration with Norwegian musician Morten Myklebust on the single "Away" was released. On 6 December, she released a collaboration with the Norwegian electronic duo Röyksopp, "Running to the Sea". They performed the song at Lydverket on 28 November 2012, as well as a cover of "Ice Machine" by Depeche Mode. A studio version of "Ice Machine" was later featured on the duo's compilation album, Late Night Tales: Röyksopp (2013), and "Running to the Sea" was later featured on the duo's fifth studio album, The Inevitable End (2014).

Sundfør collaborated with French electronic band M83 on the soundtrack for the 2013 film Oblivion. The soundtrack was released on 9 April 2013 and features the title song "Oblivion" with Sundfør contributing the main vocals. Later that month, Sundfør's back catalog was released for the first time in the United Kingdom to positive critical response. The following month, Sundfør was featured on a single by Susanna alongside Siri Nilsen. The song was recorded by the three in 2012 for the Oya Container during the Øyafestivalen in Oslo, and was released worldwide on 24 May 2013 on streaming services and for digital download. In June 2013, Sundfør remixed Maps' single "A.M.A". She also produced, programmed, arranged, recorded, provided backing vocals and played the keyboards and autoharp on the indie pop band Bow to Each Other's debut album The Urge Dreams, marking her debut as a producer.

2014–present: Ten Love Songs and Music for People in Trouble
In October 2014, "Fade Away" was released. It served as the lead single to her fourth studio album Ten Love Songs, released in February 2015. The album was Sundfør's international breakthrough, and became a commercial and critical success, debuting at number one on the Norwegian album chart and garnering critical praise from music critics, with many listing it as one of the best albums of 2015. Sundfør began a European tour to coincide with the album in March at Scala, London. Sundfør briefly moved from Oslo to East London in 2015, where she wrote in Dalston most of the songs for her next album, although she has later moved back to Oslo.

On 6 June 2017, Sundfør announced her fifth studio album Music for People in Trouble would be released on 25 August 2017 through Bella Union, although it was later delayed to 8 September due to "unforeseen circumstances". The first single from the new album "Undercover" was released on the same day of the announcement. That same day, it was also announced Sundfør would embark on a tour in support of the album. The second single "Mountaineers" featuring John Grant was released on 24 July. Upon release, the album received highly positive reviews from music critics. It debuted at number one on the Norwegian album chart, making it her fourth consecutive album to achieve this feat. The album represents a departure from the electronic-driven sound of previous records in favor of a return to her roots as a folk singer-songwriter.

Musical style and influences

Sundfør's music is varied, experimenting with various styles. Described as a mixture of experimental pop, electronica, folk, jazz, and classical music, the music she's released throughout the years also incorporates synth-pop, baroque music, electro-folk, electropop, dream pop, country, and avant-garde, while generally being labeled as an art pop musician. She has been compared to various artists, such as Kate Bush and Björk, although she's rejected these comparisons. She said the music she writes is heavily inspired by Carly Simon. Other influences she has cited include Joni Mitchell, Carole King, Cat Stevens, Radiohead, Burial, Skream, Aphex Twin, Depeche Mode, Scott Walker, Philip Glass, Sylvia Plath, and Elton John, as well as traveling, books, films, music, and "life in general."

Sundfør grew up in a mix of country, folk rock and pop music, while in 2015 she started listening to early dubstep: "When creating music in a folk rock environment the creative process isn't really taking place in the studio like it is when you're working with electronica. This ability to use the studio as a creative tool in itself made me lean more and more towards electronic music." As a record producer who's known for standing up against sexism in the music industry, she mentioned that "being a woman in electronic music often means fighting against prejudices that male persons do the programming and the females do the singing."

Personal life
Sundfør has stated that she is an atheist but that she "doesn't think science can explain everything that surrounds us," continuing: "Sometimes it's fun to imagine that there is a 'bigger' meaning, a connection, something we have not yet thought about and is expecting to reach a higher level of understanding. Sometimes the questions are more interesting than the answers."

In August 2020, Sundfør announced on Instagram that she was pregnant with her first child.

Politics
Prior to the 2017 Norwegian General Election, Sundfør showed her support for the Socialist Left Party on Twitter, writing: "Vote for solidarity and protecting our planet. Vote against capitalism. It's the only humane future."

Discography

Studio albums

Live albums

Extended plays

Singles

As lead artist

As featured artist

Guest appearances

References

External links

 
 
 

1986 births
Living people
Norwegian atheists
Norwegian singer-songwriters
University of Bergen alumni
Spellemannprisen winners
Musicians from Haugesund
English-language singers from Norway
21st-century Norwegian singers
21st-century Norwegian women singers
EMI Group artists
Bella Union artists
Warner Music Group artists